Real gases are nonideal gases whose molecules occupy space and have interactions; consequently, they do not adhere to the ideal gas law.
To understand the behaviour of real gases, the following must be taken into account:

compressibility effects;
variable specific heat capacity;
van der Waals forces;
non-equilibrium thermodynamic effects;
issues with molecular dissociation and elementary reactions with variable composition

For most applications, such a detailed analysis is unnecessary, and the ideal gas approximation can be used with reasonable accuracy. On the other hand, real-gas models have to be used near the condensation point of gases, near critical points, at very high pressures, to explain the Joule–Thomson effect, and in other less usual cases. The deviation from ideality can be described by the compressibility factor Z.

Models

Van der Waals model

Real gases are often modeled by taking into account their molar weight and molar volume

or alternatively:

Where p is the pressure, T is the temperature, R the ideal gas constant, and Vm the molar volume. a and b are parameters that are determined empirically for each gas, but are sometimes estimated from their critical temperature (Tc) and critical pressure (pc) using these relations:

The constants at critical point can be expressed as functions of the parameters a, b:

With the reduced properties  the equation can be written in the reduced form:

Redlich–Kwong model

The Redlich–Kwong equation is another two-parameter equation that is used to model real gases. It is almost always more accurate than the van der Waals equation, and often more accurate than some equations with more than two parameters. The equation is

or alternatively:

where a and b are two empirical parameters that are not the same parameters as in the van der Waals equation. These parameters can be determined:

The constants at critical point can be expressed as functions of the parameters a, b:

Using  the equation of state can be written in the reduced form:
  with

Berthelot and modified Berthelot model
The Berthelot equation (named after D. Berthelot) is very rarely used,

but the modified version is somewhat more accurate

Dieterici model
This model (named after C. Dieterici) fell out of usage in recent years

with parameters a, b, and

Clausius model
The Clausius equation (named after Rudolf Clausius) is a very simple three-parameter equation used to model gases.

or alternatively:

where

where Vc is critical volume.

Virial model
The Virial equation derives from a perturbative treatment of statistical mechanics.

or alternatively

where A, B, C, A′, B′, and C′ are temperature dependent constants.

Peng–Robinson model
Peng–Robinson equation of state (named after D.-Y. Peng and D. B. Robinson) has the interesting property being useful in modeling some liquids as well as real gases.

Wohl model

The Wohl equation (named after A. Wohl) is formulated in terms of critical values, making it useful when real gas constants are not available, but it cannot be used for high densities, as for example the critical isotherm shows a drastic decrease of pressure when the volume is contracted beyond the critical volume.

or:
 

or, alternatively:

where

 with 
, where  are (respectively) the molar volume, the pressure and the temperature at the critical point.

And with the reduced properties  one can write the first equation in the reduced form:

Beattie–Bridgeman model
 This equation is based on five experimentally determined constants. It is expressed as

where

This equation is known to be reasonably accurate for densities up to about 0.8 ρcr, where ρcr is the density of the substance at its critical point.

Benedict–Webb–Rubin model

The BWR equation, sometimes referred to as the BWRS equation,

where d is the molar density and where a, b, c, A, B, C, α, and γ are empirical constants. Note that the γ constant is a derivative of constant α and therefore almost identical to 1.

Thermodynamic expansion work
The expansion work of the real gas is different than that of the ideal gas by the quantity .

See also
Compressibility factor
Equation of state
Ideal gas law: Boyle's law and Gay-Lussac's law

References

Further reading

External links
http://www.ccl.net/cca/documents/dyoung/topics-orig/eq_state.html

Gases